Mount Pulitzer, also known as Snagtooth, is a  mountain summit located within Olympic National Park in Jefferson County of Washington state. Mount Pulitzer is the sixth-highest peak in the Bailey Range, which is a subrange of the Olympic Mountains. Its nearest neighbor is Mount Ferry,  to the northeast, and its nearest higher neighbor is Stephen Peak,  to the north. Mount Olympus is set  to the southwest. In clear weather, the mountain can be seen from the visitor center at Hurricane Ridge. Precipitation runoff from the mountain drains into tributaries of the Elwha and Hoh Rivers. The first ascent of the summit was made in 1961 by Doug Waali, Bob Wood, and Kent Heathershaw via the east ridge.

Etymology
This peak was named by the 1889-90 Seattle Press Expedition after Joseph Pulitzer (1847–1911), newspaper publisher of the New York World, his name is now best known for the Pulitzer Prize. The mountain was originally called Mt. Ferry before it was renamed.

Climate

Based on the Köppen climate classification, Mount Pulitzer is located in the marine west coast climate zone of western North America. This climate supports a small un-named glacier on the north slope. Most weather fronts originate in the Pacific Ocean, and travel northeast toward the Olympic Mountains. As fronts approach, they are forced upward by the peaks of the Olympic Range, causing them to drop their moisture in the form of rain or snowfall (Orographic lift). As a result, the Olympics experience high precipitation, especially during the winter months. During winter months, weather is usually cloudy, but, due to high pressure systems over the Pacific Ocean that intensify during summer months, there is often little or no cloud cover during the summer. The months July through September offer the most favorable weather for viewing and climbing.

Geology

The Olympic Mountains are composed of obducted clastic wedge material and oceanic crust, primarily Eocene sandstone, turbidite, and basaltic oceanic crust. The mountains were sculpted during the Pleistocene era by erosion and glaciers advancing and retreating multiple times.

Gallery

See also

 Olympic Mountains
 Geology of the Pacific Northwest

References

External links
 
 Mount Pulitzer weather: Mountain Forecast

Olympic Mountains
Mountains of Washington (state)
Landforms of Olympic National Park
Mountains of Jefferson County, Washington
North American 1000 m summits